A Burger Burn is a community event of grilling hamburgers often done for team building in the US military or as a fundraiser.

References

Fundraising events